Forests cover 13.6% of Lebanon, and other wooded lands represents 11%.  Since 2011, more than 600,000 trees, including cedars and other native species, have been planted throughout Lebanon as part of the Lebanon Reforestation Initiative (LRI). More reforestation efforts are needed. For example, the 40 hectares of Cedrus libani at Al Shouf Cedar Nature Reserve could be expanded to 3,000 hectares.

Natural areas of Lebanon include:
Aammiq Wetland, an area of marsh in the Beqaa Valley
Al Shouf Cedar Nature Reserve, an area of cedar forest around Barouk
Benta'ael, a national park area in the mountains above Byblos
Horsh Ehden, a cedar forest north of Ehden
 Forest of the Cedars of God (Horsh Arz el-Rab), the remains of an ancient Lebanese cedar forest containing some of the oldest extant Cedar trees of the country.
Jabal Rihane, a nature reserve in the Rihane mountains of south Lebanon
Palm Islands Nature Reserve, small islands near Tripoli 
Qammoua protected area, a grove of cedars, Cilicica fir and junipers in Akkar, North Lebanon
Jaj Cedars, an area of cedar forests in the Byblos District area.
Tyre Coast Nature Reserve, a Ramsar site in Southern Lebanon.
Abraham River gorge, a valley in the Byblos District.
Tannourine Cedar Reserve, a cedar forest in the mountains above Byblos.
Wadi Jhannam, a ravine in North Lebanon.
Ouadi Qadisha (the Holy Valley), a UNESCO's World Heritage Site consisting of steep valleys with a longstanding monastic history.
Yammoune
Mount Hermon

References